RDO may stand for:
 Radom Airport, Poland, IATA code
 Radio Dom Ostankino, Russian broadcaster and member of the European Broadcasting Union
 Ranidel de Ocampo (born 1981), Filipino basketball player
 Raster Document Object (.rdo), a file format used in print on demand systems manufactured by Xerox
 Rate–distortion optimization, a decision algorithm used in video compression
 Remote Data Objects, a deprecated Microsoft technology
 Red Hat Distribution of OpenStack, a community-supported distribution of OpenStack launched by Red Hat in 2013
 Red Dead Online, a 2019 video game